Kudekanye is a genus of beetles in the family Cerambycidae, and the only species in the genus is Kudekanye suidafrika. It was described by Rice in 2008.

References

Dorcasominae
Beetles described in 2008
Monotypic beetle genera